Soni Kamlesh Yadav (born 25 March 1994, Ghaziabad, Uttar Pradesh) is an Indian cricketer. She is a right-handed batter who bowls right-arm medium pace. She made her Women's One Day International cricket (WODI) debut against Sri Lanka in the 2017 Women's Cricket World Cup Qualifier on 7 February 2017.

References 

1997 births
Living people
Indian women cricketers
India women One Day International cricketers
Delhi women cricketers
North Zone women cricketers
Railways women cricketers
Sportspeople from Ghaziabad, Uttar Pradesh